Melissa Lawley (born 28 April 1994) is an English football midfielder who plays for Barclays WSL club Liverpool.

She has previously played for Bristol Academy, Birmingham City and Manchester City. Lawley has represented England at the under-17, under-19, under-20, under-23 and senior levels.

Club career
Lawley made her senior debut for Arsenal in their 6–0 Champions League win against FK Bobruichanka on 5 October 2011.
Lawley signed for Birmingham City in 2013 from Bristol Academy. In January 2016, Lawley signed a new contract with Birmingham. In December 2016, she signed for Manchester City.

On 15 June 2019, Liverpool announced they had signed Lawley ahead of the 2019–20 season.

Career statistics

International goals
. England score listed first, score column indicates score after each Lawley goal.

Honours
Manchester City
 FA Women's Cup: 2016–17

Liverpool FC
 FA Women's Championship: 2021-22

References

External links

 Profile at the Liverpool F.C. website
 Profile at the Football Association website
 
 

Living people
1994 births
England women's under-23 international footballers
England women's international footballers
English women's footballers
Women's association football midfielders
Women's Super League players
Bristol City W.F.C. players
Birmingham City W.F.C. players
Manchester City W.F.C. players
Sportspeople from Kidderminster
Liverpool F.C. Women players